Peni Volavola (born 6 June 1963) is a Fijian former rugby union footballer, he played as prop.

Career
His first cap was against Wales, at Cardiff, on 6 November 1985. He was part of the 1987 and 1991 World Cup rosters, playing 4 matches. He was not anymore called in the national team after the pool match against Romania, at Brive-la-Gaillarde, on 12 October 1991.

Club career
Between 1982 and 1986, he played for Nadi, where he played alongside Vilikesa Vatiwaliwali, Iokimi Finau, Peceli Gale, Bruce Naulago, Belasio Vukiwai, Asaeli Hughes, Ilaitia Savai, Maika Toga, Samisoni Viriviri, Ilai Korotamana, Esala Labalaba, Savenaca Aria, Sanivalati Laulau, Manasa Qoro and Epeli Turuva and won the Farebrother Trophy. He also played for Queensland.

Notes

External links
 Peni Volavola international statistics

Fiji international rugby union players
Fijian rugby union players
Rugby union props
1963 births
Living people
Fijian expatriates in Australia
I-Taukei Fijian people